Leaf mantis (and leafy mantis) is a common name for certain praying mantises including:
those often also called shield mantis, i.e. species within Choeradodis, Rhombodera, and similar genera
Dead leaf mantis species such as those within genus Deroplatys

See also
List of mantis genera and species

Insect common names
Mantodea